Octyl cyanoacrylate (OCA), a cyanoacrylate ester, is an octyl ester of 2-cyano-2-propenoic acid. It is a clear colorless liquid with a sharp, irritating odor. Its chief use is as the main component of medical cyanoacrylate glues.

In medical and veterinary applications, OCA, n-butyl cyanoacrylate (n-BCA) and isobutyl cyanoacrylate (ICA) are commonly used. They provide rapid wound closure, are bacteriostatic, and their use is usually painless. Butyl esters provide a stronger bond, but the glue is rigid. The octyl ester, while providing weaker bond, is more flexible. Blends of OCA and n-BCA are available which offer both flexibility and a strong bond.

It polymerizes rapidly in presence of moisture.

Heating to higher temperatures causes pyrolysis and depolymerization of the cured glue, producing gaseous products strongly irritating to the lungs and eyes.

References

See also
 Methyl cyanoacrylate
 Ethyl cyanoacrylate
 Butyl cyanoacrylate
 2-Octyl cyanoacrylate

Cyanoacrylate esters
Monomers